Neeloor  is an agriculture-oriented rural village in the Taluk of Meenachil, Kottayam district, Kerala. The village is situated on the hill sides of Noorumala, Ellumpuram and Perumkunnu which are hills on the borders of Kottayam district and the neighboring Idukki district. Earlier the place was known as "Kallidapootha".

History

Being a rural village, the entire region is covered by different sorts of farming. The historical backdrop of Neeloor is blurred in the pages of history. At the same time 'Sree Dharma Shasta Temple', Ambalabhagam, 2 km away from Neeloor suggests that the place has hundreds of years old legacy.

The new history begins with the beginning of the 20th century, when people from other areas came to Neeloor and settled here. In 1924 a chapel was established in the name of Saint Joseph and soon a primary school was started here. Later a parish was established here in the name of St. Francis Xavier in 1925.
 The parish now comes under the catholic diocese of Palai, Kerala. This parish now constitutes over 550 families and 3015 parishners.

In 1959 the primary school was upgraded to Upper Primary School and in 1961 a high school was started. The high school was among the first recognised un-aided schools in Kerala and today it is well known as St. Joseph's English Medium High School and has a long history of 100% pass in SSLC Examinations.  Currently a CBSE school is also functioning along with it.

Economy 
Neeloor's economy is mainly dependent on agriculture. The major cultivation is natural rubber. Different crops like coconut, pepper, coco, tapioca, banana, ginger, turmeric, etc. are also cultivated here. Cattle, goat and chicken are commonly domesticated here. A unit of Milma milk producers' society is working here to support the milk production in the region.

Politics
Neeloor is part of the Kottayam Lok Sabha constituency and Pala Assembly Constituency (Neeloor was part of Poonjar Assembly Constituency till 2011). Main political parties in Neeloor include Indian National Congress, Kerala Congress, CPIM and BJP.

Transportation
People of this area mostly depend on public transportation through road. The nearest railway station is Kottayam (43 km). Palai and Thodupuzha are the nearest towns and one can reach Neeloor easily by bus from these towns. The nearest airport is at Kochi (67 km) (Cochin International Airport).

Timeline
 AD 1650 - Neeloor Temple established 
 1925 - Foundation of St.Xaviour's Parish Church 
 1927 - Establishment of St.Joseph Chappel at Neeloor
 1934 - St.Joseph L.P School established 
 1934 - Construction of St. Benedict Mount Shrine at Ellumpuram 
 1955 - Neeloor Post Office functioned 
 1960 - L.P School upgraded to U.P School and inauguration of Neeloor Service Co-Operative Bank.
 1962 - Established NSS office at Amabalabhagam 
 1961 - St.Joseph EMHS established 
 1963 - Savio Home-Boy's Hostel founded and Palai-Thodupuzha Bus service started
 1964 - St.Joseph statue created at Neeloor
 1966 - Pala to Kattappana Bus Service through Neeloor
 1972 - Electricity came to Neeloor 
 1984 - Vincent De Paul Society started
 1987 - Renovation of Parish Cemetery
 1997 - SNDP Gurumandhiram founded
 1998 - Inauguration of a 20 shutter building at Neeloor
 2005 - St. Joseph's Public School started
 2008 - Akshaya Centre started

Institutions in the village
 St.Joseph English Medium High School, Neeloor 
 Neeloor Service Co-Operative Bank
 Neeloor Post Office (Pin-686651)
 St. Joseph's UP School Neeloor
 NSS Karayogam Office
 SNDP Gurumandiram
 Savio Home-Boy's Hostel, Neeloor
 Gorethi Bhavan-Girl's Hostel
 Sacred Heart Convent, Neeloor 
 SH Nursery School, Neeloor
 Akshaya e-centre
 Nabard Information Center
 Milma ksheera sahakarana sangham
 St.Joseph Public School Neeloor
 Farmer's Club Neeloor
 Rubber Producers Society

Religious Institutions

 St. Xavier's Church, Neeloor
 St. Joseph Chappel, Neeloor
 Sree Dharma Shasta Temple, Ambalabhagam, Neeloor 
 St. Benedict Mount Shrine, Ellumpuram

Nearest towns and villages
 Palai [17 km]
 Thodupuzha [18 km]
 Kollappally [9 km]
 Muttom [9 km]
 Mattathippara [5 km]
 Karimkunnam [11 km]
 Erattupetta [18 km]
 Bharananganam [18 km]

References

Villages in Kottayam district